Ukrainian medical Lyceum at Bogomolets National Medical University (UML NMU) pursuant to its Charter (License from Chief Administration of education and science in city Kyiv No 111098, dd. 11.06.09) is the state's secondary establishment of general education that provides with acquisition of education over state educational minimum, carries out pre-professional education of youth, prepares it to study at higher medical (pharmaceutical) school and to work at health care establishments as junior medical staff.

From history of Lyceum’s establishment 
Ukrainian O.O. Bogomolets medical university (now O.O. Bogomolets National medical university) on 18, April, 1990 opened the medical classes for the first time in ex-USSR and Ukraine at the initiative of academician in NAS, AMS and APS of Ukraine Ye.G. Goncharuk; these classes in 1991 acquired the status of state medical lyceums on the base of Lesia Ukrainka classical gymnasium No 117 (director – L.M. Boyko) and natural lyceum No 157 (director – V.I. Kostenko), which became the necessary component in construction of system for continuous medical education.
The uniform Ukrainian medical lyceum, which founders were O.O. Bogomolets National medical university and Starokyivska (now Shevchenkivska) district state administration in c. Kyiv, was established on 11, June, 1997 with assistance from Ministry of education and science of Ukraine, Ministry of Health care of Ukraine, Kyiv city state administration.
The Guardian Council of lyceum by 2014 was headed by Hero of Ukraine, Councilor of President of Ukraine, People's deputy of Ukraine from I-VI convocation, Chairman of Verkhovna Rada of Ukraine from I and III convocations, President of International P. Kulish Charitable Fund I.S. Pliusch.

Entrance to lyceum 
Pupils from all regions of Ukraine, CIS countries and foreign citizens (according to existing legislation of Ukraine), who have graduated from 8-9th classes at general education school and passed through competitive selection, are enrolled to lyceum.
The competitive selection is carried out pursuant to complex occupational tests (Ukrainian language and literature, biology) by Admission commission at O.O. Bogomolets National medical university.
The study period at Lyceum is three years for students who enter after the eighth grade and two years for students who enter after the ninth grade.

Achievements 
Today Lyceum is a highly skilled scientific pedagogical collective that unites seven departments at O.O. Bogomolets National medical university (medical and biological physics, biology, bioorganic, biological and pharmaceutical chemistry, medical and general chemistry, foreign language, Latin language, propaedeutics of internal medicine No 1), medical gymnasium No 33 in c. Kyiv.
Lyceum teaches pursuant to state programs and has over 20 integrated author's programs.

The educational process is provided by over 90 teachers, among them 67 teachers of the University (8 professors, 45 assistant professors and senior teachers, the rest of them are candidates of sciences) and 23 teachers-Methodists. Among them, there are 5 academicians and corresponding members of NAS, NAMS, NAPS of Ukraine, 10 Honorary scientists and technicians of Ukraine, Honorary doctors of Ukraine, Honorary educationalists of Ukraine, 4 laureates of State prize in the sphere of science and technology in Ukraine.

Scientific pedagogical schools of all-Ukrainian and European level were established and work at lyceum.
Special and elective courses: Medical psychology, Basics of business ethics and medical deontology, History of medicine, Vocational-oriented education of pupils to medical specialties, Bioethics, Latin and Old Greek language, Chinese language, Ecology, Basics of health and future professional medical activity.

During its existence Lyceum educated over 2,500 pupils, among them over 100 foreign citizens. Each tenth graduate from O.O. Bogomolets National medical university is a graduate from Lyceum. Among them 50 graduates from Lyceum are included into Golden honorary book of University, 360 persons defended Master's, Candidate's and Doctor's dissertations in Ukraine, 45 graduates defended Master's and Doctor's dissertations (PhD, MD) in leading countries over the world.
Pre-professional training is carried out on the base of the best clinical and medical preventive health care establishments in city Kyiv.
Graduates from lyceum are awarded with qualification “Junior hospital nurse on care for patients” and received Certificates of established form.
For the first time among medical schools in Ukraine lyceum was awarded with the Great Silver Medal from International Pedagogical Academy (Russia, c. Moscow, 2000) for achievements in the sphere of education, culture and science.
The educational establishment was awarded with the Honorary diploma from Verkhovna Rada of Ukraine, Cabinet of Ministers of Ukraine, Ministry of health care of Ukraine, Honorary Diploma from Ministry of education and science, youth and sport of Ukraine, Kyiv city state administration.
Lyceum was awarded with 20 Golden medal of International educational exhibitions and contests, according to National rating of Ukraine it was acknowledged as “Flagman of science and education” (2008), Honorary title “Leader in modern education” (2009).
Winners in all-Ukrainian Olympiads and contests, famous sportsmen, champions of Ukraine and Europe studied and continue studying at lyceum.
The confirmation for high level of quality in study at lyceum is the results from External independent assessment of quality in education. Among graduates from Lyceum (2008–2012) 19 persons received per 200 scores in Ukrainian language and literature, biology, chemistry, physics.
Lyceum has its own press organ – “Herald of Ukrainian medical lyceum at O.O. Bogomolets National medical university”.

Administration of lyceum 
Deputy directors
Ivanenko Ruslana Valeriyivna – Candidate of Pedagogy, assistant professor, Outstanding worker of Ukraine, Laureate of P. Kulish and A.P. Romodanov prizes, awarded with Honorary diploma from Chairman of KCSA, Honorary diploma from MHC of Ukraine
Pereymybida Larysa Valentynivna – Candidate of Pedagogy, assistant professor, Outstanding worker of Ukraine, Laureate of P. Kulish and A.P. Romodanov prizes, awarded with Honorary diploma from Chairman of KCSA, Honorary diploma from MHC of Ukraine

Scientific activity 
Lyceum is a member society in Minor academy of sciences of Ukraine since 1997.
A.P. Romodanov scientific society of Lyceum pupils for the first time among general education establishment in 2001 was awarded with the highest decoration “Golden Owl” from Presidium in Minor academy of sciences of Ukraine, which was presented at the General meeting of the academy by Hero of Ukraine, President of NAS of Ukraine, academician B.Ye. Paton.
Since 2000 lyceum keeps the first place among general education establishments in city Kyiv due to results from scientific contests-presentations at Minor academy of sciences of Ukraine.
Lyceum is the Absolute winner in all-Ukrainian contest of scientific research works by pupils-members in MAS among 9-11th classes in city Kyiv. Ukrainian medical lyceum was announced as the Leader in implementation of new forms for organization of scientific research work among 9-11th classes from the high tribune of Presidium of Academy of sciences of Ukraine.
Every year graduates from lyceum become winners in III stage of all-Ukrainian contest-presentation of scientific research works by pupils-members in MAS of Ukraine and IV stage of all-Ukrainian pupils’ Olympiads.

International activity 
Ukrainian medical lyceum is a member in foundation of UNESCO associated schools (2000).
Lyceum has the international educational and scientific contacts, anticipated by bilateral agreements with over 30 foreign educational establishments in Europe and USA.
Lyceum is a partner of Institute of biophysics at RAS and experimental school-laboratory at APS of Russia (Russia, c. Puschyno, 1997), concluded Agreements about cooperation with department of biophysics at M.M. Lomonosov Moscow state university, P. Kulish gymnasium (c. Borzna, Chernihiv region)

Clinical bases of lyceum 
 A.P. Romodanov Institute of neurosurgery at NAMS of Ukraine
 Kyiv city clinical oncological center
 Institute of cancer
 Institute of endocrinology and metabolism at NAMS of Ukraine
 Center of polytrauma, thoracal center (KCCH No 17)
 R.Ye. Kavetskyy Institute of experimental pathology, oncology and radiobiology at NAS of Ukraine
 Institute of pediatrics, obstetrics and gynecology at NAS of Ukraine
 Center of pediatric surgery, microsurgery, toxicology and methods of efferent therapy, medical psychological (Okhmatdyt)
 Central clinical hospital of State border guard service of Ukraine (department of propaedeutics of internal medicine No 1 at O.O. Bogomolets NMU)
 Kyiv city clinical hospital No 18 (department of pathomorphology at O.O. Bogomolets NMU)
 Kyiv city psychiatric hospital, named after Pavlov
 Oleksandrivska hospital

Medical schools in Ukraine